The South African type XE1 tender was a steam locomotive tender from the pre-Union era in the Cape of Good Hope.

The Type XE1 tender first entered service in 1902, as tenders to the second batch of ten   Mastodon type steam locomotives which were acquired by the Cape Government Railways in that year. These locomotives were designated Class 8 on the South African Railways in 1912.

Manufacturers
Type XE1 tenders were built between 1901 and 1904 by Kitson and Company, Neilson, Reid and Company and North British Locomotive Company.

The 8th Class locomotive and tender were designed in 1901 by H.M. Beatty, Chief Locomotive Superintendent of the Cape Government Railways (CGR), at the Salt River works in Cape Town. The Type XE1 first entered service in 1902, as tender to the second batch of ten out of altogether 23 8th Class  Mastodon type locomotives which were built for the CGR by Neilson, Reid and Company. These locomotives were designated Class 8 on the South African Railways (SAR) in 1912.

Until 1904, more were delivered as tenders to five more locomotive types of the CGR, two more 8th Class Mastodon types in 1903 of which one was experimental, the 9th Class 2-8-2 Mikado type in 1903 and two 8th Class  Consolidation types in 1903 and 1904.

Characteristics

Locomotives

In the SAR years, tenders were numbered for the engines they were delivered with. In most cases, an oval number plate, bearing the engine number and often also the tender type, would be attached to the rear end of the tender. During the classification and renumbering of locomotives onto the SAR roster in 1912, no separate classification and renumbering list was published for tenders, which should have been renumbered according to the locomotive renumbering list.

Six locomotive classes were delivered new with Type XE1 tenders, built by three manufacturers. Bearing in mind that tenders could and did migrate between engines, the tenders should have been numbered in the SAR number ranges as shown.
 1902: CGR 8th Class of 1902, SAR Class 8, second batch, numbers 1072 to 1081.
 1903: CGR 8th Class of 1903, SAR Class 8D, numbers 1192 to 1229.
 1903: CGR 8th Class Experimental, SAR Class 8E, numbers 1230 to 1233.
 1903: CGR 8th Class 2-8-0 of 1903, SAR Class 8Y, numbers 896 to 899.
 1903: CGR 9th Class of 1903, SAR Class Experimental 4, numbers 910 and 911.
 1904: CGR 8th Class 2-8-0 of 1904, SAR Class 8Z, numbers 900 to 907.

Classification letters
Since many tender types are interchangeable between different locomotive classes and types, a tender classification system was adopted by the SAR. The first letter of the tender type indicates the classes of engines to which it can be coupled. The "X_" tenders could be used with the locomotive classes as shown.
 CGR Mountain, SAR Class 4.
 SAR Class 4A.
 SAR Class 5.
 CGR 6th Class of 1897, SAR Class 6B.
 Oranje-Vrijstaat Gouwerment-Spoorwegen 6th Class L3, SAR Class 6E.
 CGR 6th Class of 1901 (Neilson, Reid), SAR Class 6H.
 CGR 6th Class of 1902, SAR Class 6J.
 CGR 8th Class of 1902, SAR Class 8.
 Imperial Military Railways 8th Class, SAR Class 8A.
 Central South African Railways Class 8-L2, SAR Class 8B.
 Central South African Railways Class 8-L3, SAR Class 8C.
 CGR 8th Class 4-8-0 of 1903, SAR Class 8D.
 CGR 8th Class Experimental, SAR Class 8E.
 CGR 8th Class 4-8-0 of 1904, SAR Class 8F.
 CGR 8th Class 2-8-0 of 1903, SAR Class 8Y.
 CGR 8th Class 2-8-0 of 1904, SAR Class 8Z.
 Central South African Railways Class 9, SAR Class 9.
 Central South African Railways Class 10, SAR Class 10.
 Central South African Railways Class 10-2 Saturated, SAR Class 10A.
 Central South African Railways Class 10-2 Superheated. SAR Class 10B.
 Central South African Railways Class 10-C, SAR Class 10C.
 Central South African Railways Class 11, SAR Class 11.
 CGR 9th Class of 1903, SAR Class Experimental 4.
 CGR 9th Class of 1906, SAR Class Experimental 5.
 CGR 10th Class, SAR Class Experimental 6.
 SAR Class ME.
 Central South African Railways Mallet Superheated, SAR Class MF.

The second letter indicates the tender's water capacity.

A number, when added after the letter code, indicates differences between similar tender types, such as function, wheelbase or coal bunker capacity.

Modifications and rebuilding
The official SAR diagram book contains an annotation with the Type XE1 drawing to the effect that tender no. 552, a three-axle Type YC tender off a SAR Class 6C locomotive, was added to the type in 1956. While the reason is not apparent from the document, it could only have been as a result of a modification of the tender's engine drawgear which would place it in the "X_" tender group and of the tender being fitted with a larger water tank which would place it in the "_E" tender group.

Modifications
Pictures of most of these locomotives in service show them with tenders with built-up sides to the coal bunker, to increase the coal capacity. Early versions of the built-up coal bunker sides were in the form of a slatted open-top cage, made of rectangular steel rods. Later versions were constructed of sheet-metal. In the second example depicted, a Type XE1 tender with a sheet-metal extended coal bunker is plinthed with CGR 6th Class no. 356, an engine which is suited for Type "Y_", not Type "X_" tenders.

Rebuilding
From c. 1925, some Type Type XE1 tenders from Classes 6H, 6J and 8 were completely rebuilt by the SAR by mounting a new upper structure on the existing underframe. These rebuilt tenders had a more modern appearance, with flush sides all the way to the top of the coal bunker.

The program to rebuild several older tender types with new upper structures was begun by Col F.R. Collins DSO, who approved several of the detailed drawings for the work during his term in office as Chief Mechanical Engineer of the SAR from 1922 to 1929. It was continued by his successor, A.G. Watson.

Illustration

References

XE1